Arbuthnot or Arbuthnott is a Scottish surname, deriving from the village in Scotland from where members of the Arbuthnot family originated.

People with the surname Arbuthnot or Arbuthnott
Arbuthnot baronets
Viscount of Arbuthnott
Alexander Arbuthnot (disambiguation), several people
Betty Carnegy-Arbuthnott (1822–1904), British benefactor
Betty Arbuthnott, Scottish fencer
Charles Arbuthnot (disambiguation), several people
Eric Arbuthnot, South African cricketer
Forster Fitzgerald Arbuthnot (1833–1901), British Orientalist and translator
Geoffrey Arbuthnot (1885–1957), British naval officer during World War I, later Fourth Sea Lord
George Arbuthnot (disambiguation), several people
Gerald Arbuthnot (1872–1916), British soldier and politician, MP from Burnley
Harriet Arbuthnot (1793–1834), English diarist, social observer, and political hostess
Hugh Arbuthnot (disambiguation), several people
James Arbuthnot (born 1952), British politician and MP
James George Arbuthnot, American wrestling coach of the Oregon State Beavers
John Arbuthnot (disambiguation), several people
Keith Arbuthnot (disambiguation), several people
Lionel Gough Arbuthnot, English cricketer
Malcolm Arbuthnot (1877–1967), British pictorialist photographer and artist
Mariot Arbuthnot (1711–1794), British admiral during the American Revolutionary war
May Hill Arbuthnot (1884–1969), American educator, writer, and editor
Michael Arbuthnot, American archaeologist and film-maker
Reginald Arbuthnot, English cricketer
Robert Arbuthnot (disambiguation), several people
Thomas Arbuthnot (disambiguation), several people
William Arbuthnot (disambiguation), several people

Fictional characters
Sandy Arbuthnot, in the Richard Hannay book series by John Buchan
Colonel John Arbuthnot, in Murder on the Orient Express by Agatha Christie
 Freddie Arbuthnot, in the Bertie Wooster stories of P. G. Wodehouse
 James Charles Arbuthnot, in the novel A Graveyard for Lunatics by Ray Bradbury
 Mrs. Arbuthnot, in the play A Woman of No Importance by Oscar Wilde
 Frederick Arbuthnot, in the book The Enchanted April by Elizabeth von Arnim
 Mrs. Arbuthnot, in the movie Mrs. Palfrey at the Claremont by Dan Ireland, based on the novel by Elizabeth Taylor
 Freddy Arbuthnot, in Lord Peter Wimsey stories by Dorothy L. Sayers
 Fredericka "Freddy" Arbuthnot, in several books by Gregory Mcdonald

References

Surnames of Scottish origin